Songs of the Scribe is the seventh studio album from Irish singer Pádraigín Ní Uallacháin, who is also Traditional Singer in Residence at the Seamus Heaney Centre For Poetry at Queen's University, Belfast. Released on 3 December 2011, the album features old and newly written translations by Ní Uallacháin, Ciaran Carson and Seamus Heaney and harp accompaniment by Helen Davies. Recorded in Copenhagen, Denmark, Songs of the Scribe was inspired by the manuscripts held in the library of St. Gallen. Pádraigín visited the library to research the manuscripts, carried to safety from Viking attack by St. Gall and others from Bangor, County Down to Europe over a number of centuries.

Track listing

Personnel
Pádraigín Ní Uallacháin – vocals, drones, bells
Helen Davies – Irish harp, wire-strung harp, monochords, Tibetan bowl
Thomas Li – recording/mixing

Release history

References

External links
 Songs of the Scribe - official website

2011 albums
Pádraigín Ní Uallacháin albums